Patrick Aloysius O'Boyle (July 18, 1896 – August 10, 1987) was an American prelate of the Roman Catholic Church. He served as the first resident Archbishop of Washington from 1948 to 1973, and was elevated to the cardinalate in 1967.

Early life and education
Patrick O'Boyle was born in Scranton, Pennsylvania, to Michael and Mary (née Muldoon) O'Boyle, who were Irish immigrants. His father was originally from Glenties, County Donegal, and in 1889 came to the United States, where he settled at Bedford, New York. His mother moved to New York City from County Mayo in 1879, and later married O'Boyle in December 1893. Shortly afterwards they moved to Scranton, where Michael became a steelworker; they had a daughter who died during infancy in 1895.

Patrick was baptized two days after his birth at St. Paul's Church in Scranton. Following his father's death in January 1907, he helped support his mother by becoming a paperboy. He dropped out of school in 1910 to pursue a full-time career with the Bradstreet Company, but entered St. Thomas College in 1911 upon the orders of a local priest. In addition to his studies, he there served as class librarian and editor of the monthly magazine The Aquinas.

Priesthood
O'Boyle graduated from St. Thomas' as valedictorian in 1916, and then began his studies for the priesthood at St. Joseph's Seminary in Yonkers, New York. During his time at St. Joseph's, he developed a close friendship with James Francis McIntyre, later Archbishop of Los Angeles and a cardinal as well, who tutored him in Latin and invited him to spend holidays with his family. One of his professors was Rev. Francis P. Duffy, a famed chaplain of World War I.

O'Boyle was ordained a priest by Archbishop Patrick Joseph Hayes on May 21, 1921. The next day he celebrated his first Mass at St. Paul's Church in his native Scranton. He returned to New York the following June, when he became a curate at St. Columba's Church in the Chelsea section of Manhattan. He there organized St. Joseph's Society for teenaged boys, beginning with about 300 members, and instituted parish dances. From 1926 to 1933, O'Boyle was director of the Catholic Guardian Society, a division of Catholic Charities dedicated to orphans and foster children; during this time, he also resided and did pastoral work at Holy Innocents Church. Sheila Wickouski identifies social concerns, labor rights, and racial equality as O'Boyle's key issues.

He furthered his studies at the New York School of Social Work from 1927 to 1932. He also taught child welfare at Fordham Graduate School of Social Service from 1930 to 1934. In 1933 he organized the National Conference of Catholic Charities. O'Boyle worked closely with the New Deal agency Works Progress Administration to find employment for young people as well. He then served as director of the Mission of the Immaculate Virgin, also known as Mount Loretto, on Staten Island from 1936 to 1943.

He was raised to the rank of a Privy Chamberlain of His Holiness in 1941 and a Domestic Prelate of His Holiness on 1944. He was director of the War Relief Services of the National Catholic Welfare Conference (1943–1947), before being named director of the Catholic Charities in New York on August 1, 1947.

Bishop
According to Raymond Kupke, O'Boyle's work at War Relief Services and his ability in dealing with governmental and non-governmental agencies during the war and postwar periods caught the attention of the Apostolic Delegate, Archbishop Amleto Giovanni Cicognani.
On November 27, 1947, he was appointed Archbishop of Washington by Pope Pius XII. O'Boyle received his episcopal consecration on January 14, 1948, from Cardinal Francis Spellman, with Bishops John McNamara and Henry Klonowski serving as co-consecrators, in St. Patrick's Cathedral. According to Wickouski, O'Boyle's view of his role was shaped by his experience as an administrator under Spellman.

Known for his opposition to racism, in 1948 he led the way to desegregation of the American school system by racially integrating the Catholic schools of Washington six years before the U.S. Supreme Court ruled segregation unconstitutional. He started with the city of Washington first and then expanded to the southern counties of Maryland that were part of the archdiocese, first with the colleges and universities, then the high schools, and finally the parochial elementary schools.

In 1949, O'Boyle delivered the benediction at the inauguration of President Harry S. Truman. In 1959, Bishop O’Boyle consecrated the United States to the Immaculate Heart of Mary.

In April 1964, in the midst of Congressional debate on the Civil Rights Bill, O'Boyle chaired the Inter-religious Convocation on Civil Rights at Georgetown University. In giving the invocation, O'Boyle said that "There is in every man a priceless dignity which is your heritage. From this dignity flow the rights of man, and the duty in justice that all must respect and honor these rights..." In his remarks, he urged Congress to pass the bill and those present to "tell our Representatives our conviction that such a law is a moral obligation."

From 1962 to 1965, he attended the Second Vatican Council. He was made Metropolitan Archbishop on October 12, 1965, upon Washington's promotion to that ecclesiastical status. On August 28, 1963, he delivered the invocation which began the March on Washington.

Cardinal
He was created Cardinal Priest of San Nicola in Carcere by Pope Paul VI in the consistory of June 26, 1967. At the same ceremony, Archbishop Karol Wojtyła of Kraków (the future Pope John Paul II) was also elevated to the College of Cardinals. O'Boyle resigned as Washington's archbishop on March 3, 1973, after twenty-five years of service.

Views
O'Boyle was socially progressive but theologically conservative. He was an ardent supporter of Paul VI's encyclical Humanae Vitae, and placed ecclesiastical censures on priests who dissented from its teachings. During his younger days, he supported Robert M. La Follette, Sr. and Al Smith.

A staunch opponent of racism, O'Boyle wrote:

Those who deny a neighbor, solely on the basis of race, the opportunity to buy a house, or to enjoy equal educational and job opportunities, are in effect denying those rights to Christ Himself.

Death
Cardinal O'Boyle died in Washington, D.C., in 1987 at age 91. He was the first person to be interred in a burial chamber constructed inside the Cathedral of St. Matthew the Apostle for the Archbishops of Washington. It is also the final resting place of Cardinal James Aloysius Hickey and Cardinal William Wakefield Baum.

References

External links
 New York Times: Cardinal O'Boyle of Washington, Liberal who Espoused Orthodoxy

1896 births
1987 deaths
20th-century American cardinals
Roman Catholic archbishops of Washington
Activists for African-American civil rights
American people of Irish descent
Participants in the Second Vatican Council
University of Scranton alumni
Cardinals created by Pope Paul VI
Columbia University School of Social Work alumni
Fordham University alumni